John Livingston Eaton (born May 29, 1934, Washington, D.C.) is an American pianist, musicologist, humorist, educator and interpreter of jazz and American popular music. He is "considered one of the foremost interpreters of American music."

Early life 
Eaton was born in Washington, D.C. He first learned about jazz from his father, a journalist who played the piano every evening after work.

He attended Yale University where he studied with renowned classical teacher Alexander Lipsky. There, he was a member of the social and literary fraternity St. Anthony Hall. He graduated from Yale University in 1956.

Career 
Eaton started playing music in the late 1960s. He played in the house trio of Blues Alley, playing with the touring stars who needed a backing band for three years. He also played  piano in hotel lounges.

In 1988, he was named to the Steinway Concert Artist roster. Also in 1988, Eaton has performed as headliner in the East Room of the White House for President Reagan, and both as soloist and with artists as Zoot Sims, Benny Carter, Duke Ellington, Clark Terry, and Wild Bill Davison. He has been a featured player at the Kool Jazz Festival and the Smithsonian Institution Performing Arts Jazz series, broadcast nationally on National Public Radio and Radio Smithsonian.  

Characterized by Nat Hentoff as "the complete pianist... the master of just about the whole spectrum of jazz music", John Eaton is profiled in Leonard Feather and Ira Gitler's Encyclopedia of Jazz, and has been reviewed by prominent music critics.

Works 
Eaton is known for a CD series project John Eaton Presents the American Popular Song in cooperation with the Wolf Trap Foundation for the Performing Arts, the operational partner of the Wolf Trap National Park for the Performing Arts. This includes thirteen separate recorded broadcast programs in concert and conversation with jazz bassist Jay Leonhart.  Each program focuses on major artists, composers or collaborators in American music, including Richard Rodgers, Harold Arlen, George Gershwin, Jerome Kern, Cole Porter, Julie Styne, Irving Berlin, Kurt Weill and Vernon Duke, and Hoagy Carmichael and Fats Waller, Duke Ellington, Harry Warren, Jimmy Van Heusen, Frank Loesser, The Beatles, and Bob Dylan.

Personal 
Eaton lives in American University Park in Washington, D.C.

References

Living people
1934 births
Musicians from Washington, D.C.
Yale College alumni
St. Anthony Hall
20th-century American pianists
American male pianists
21st-century American pianists
20th-century American male musicians
21st-century American male musicians